Scott Borland (born February 14, 1979) is an American musician.

Borland is the co-founder, along with his older brother Wes Borland, of the American metal band Big Dumb Face. Scott Borland also contributed to the first three albums by his brother's band Limp Bizkit.

Biography 
Originally from Richmond, Virginia, Scott went to middle school and high school in Jacksonville, FL, and took an interest in bass guitar, starting to play together with his brother Wes. The Borland family later moved to Jacksonville, Florida, where Scott attended college. Borland provided arrangements and played keyboards for the albums Three Dollar Bill, Yall (1997), Significant Other (1999) and Chocolate Starfish and the Hot Dog Flavored Water (2000) by Limp Bizkit, the band Wes joined in the mid-1990s. He also played keyboards on Vanilla Ice's 1998 album Hard to Swallow and bass on the Lennon album 5:30 Saturday Morning.

In 1998, Scott and Wes Borland formed Big Dumb Face, an American metal band influenced by Ween and Mr. Bungle. The group released their debut album Duke Lion Fights the Terror!! in March 2001, followed by Where Is Duke Lion? He's Dead... in October 2017 and Christmas in the Cave of Dagoth in December 2021.

In 2002, Scott was also part of Wes's short-lived side project Eat the Day.

Also in 2002, Borland contributed additional keyboards to the self-titled debut album of the American nu metal band Stepa.

References

1979 births
Living people
American rock bass guitarists
American rock guitarists
American male bass guitarists
American rock keyboardists
Musicians from Jacksonville, Florida
Guitarists from Virginia
Musicians from Richmond, Virginia
Guitarists from Florida
21st-century American bass guitarists
21st-century American keyboardists
21st-century American male musicians